Vazzola is a comune (municipality) in the Province of Treviso in the Italian region Veneto, located about  north of Venice and about  northeast of Treviso.

Vazzola borders the following municipalities: Cimadolmo, Codogné, Fontanelle, Mareno di Piave, San Polo di Piave.

References

Cities and towns in Veneto